Soroseris glomerata is a species of thick stem flowering plant in the family Asteraceae, a type of lettuce with small leaves of China, where it is called 绢毛菊.

References

glomerata